is a Japanese racing driver for the Honda Motor Company. He currently drives in the GT500 class of the Autobacs Super GT Series, and the Super Formula Championship, where he is the 2021 and 2022 series champion.

Racing career

Early career 
Nojiri began his karting career in the All-Japan Karting Championship in 2003, and in 2006, he became the FA class champion. Nojiri moved to Europe to race in the European championship, the Italian Masters, and World Cup KF1 in 2007. In 2008, Nojiri was the top graduate from the Suzuka Circuit Racing School Formula, earning him a scholarship to compete in Formula Challenge Japan (FCJ) for 2009. He finished fifth in the FCJ standings in 2009, and again in 2010, while also finishing fifth in the JAF Formula 4 West Series in 2009.

In 2011, Nojiri graduated to the All-Japan Formula 3 Championship National Class with HFDP Racing. He won three times, including in his first start at Suzuka Circuit, and finished second in the championship to Katsumasa Chiyo. In 2021, Nojiri stepped up to the main level championship in Japanese F3; he finished fifth in the standings, and won the tenth round at Okayama International Circuit. Nojiri moved to Toda Racing in 2013, where he finished fourth in the championship.

Super Formula (2014–present) 

In 2014, Nojiri joined Docomo Team Dandelion Racing in the Japanese Super Formula Championship. In the sixth and penultimate round of the championship at Sportsland Sugo, Nojiri scored his first career victory in just his seventh race. He finished the year tenth in the championship, and won Rookie of the Year honours ahead of Formula One veteran Vitantonio Liuzzi, and reigning Japanese F3 champion Yuichi Nakayama. Nojiri remained with Dandelion Racing from 2015 to 2018. He finished seventh in the championship in 2015, ninth in 2016, and seventh in 2018. Over these four seasons, Nojiri won three pole positions, recorded four podiums, and two fastest laps.

For the 2019 season, Nojiri transferred to Team Mugen, in a swap for reigning champion Naoki Yamamoto (who took Nojiri's place at Dandelion Racing). The move to Mugen, along with the introduction of the new Dallara SF19 chassis, paid dividends for Nojiri. He finished a career-best fourth in the championship, while also ending a five-year winless drought at the season-ending JAF Grand Prix in Suzuka. He finished fifth in the championship in 2020, winning the fourth round at Autopolis from pole position.

Nojiri won back-to-back races at Fuji Speedway and Suzuka to open the 2021 season. He then went on to win the fifth round at Mobility Resort Motegi from pole position. In the next race at Motegi, Nojiri finished fifth to clinch his first Super Formula drivers' championship, becoming the first driver since Loïc Duval in 2009 to clinch the Japanese top formula championship before the final round of the season.

His form carried into 2022: Nojiri opened the season with a win and second place finish at the doubleheader weekend at Fuji, along with a pole position in round two. He strung together four consecutive pole positions, six podiums and never finished lower than fourth in the first eight races of the season. At the JAF Grand Prix Suzuka, Nojiri won the pole for the first race, and clinched his second consecutive championship with a second place finish. He completed the season with a pole-to-win victory, his second of the season. Nojiri became the first driver since Tsugio Matsuda to win consecutive championships in Japanese top formula racing.

Super GT (2013–present) 

Nojiri's first Super GT start came in the GT300 class, driving Autobacs Racing Team Aguri (ARTA)'s Honda CR-Z GT300 at the 2013 Suzuka 1000km. He stepped up to full-time Super GT competition in 2014 with Team Mugen, taking over for reigning GT300 champion Hideki Mutoh. Nojiri and co-driver Yuhki Nakayama finished tenth in the GT300 championship, with a third place finish at the Fuji 500km.

In 2015, Nojiri moved up to the GT500 class with ARTA. He finished fourth in his top class debut, at Okayama. Two years later, Nojiri won his first GT500 pole in the fourth round at Sugo, and then won the fifth round at Fuji Speedway (with co-driver Takashi Kobayashi) to take his first career GT500 victory. Takuya Izawa transferred to ARTA as Nojiri's new co-driver in 2018. Nojiri and Izawa won the third round at Suzuka, and the eighth and final round at Motegi, en route to a third place finish in the GT500 championship. They won the rain-shortened opening round at Okayama in 2019, but fell to tenth in the standings at the end of the season.

For 2020, Nirei Fukuzumi joined ARTA as Nojiri's co-driver. After a difficult start to the season, Nojiri and Fukuzumi strung together four top five finishes to finish the year fifth in the championship; this included a win at the seventh round at Motegi. Nojiri and Fukuzumi returned to ARTA for the 2021 season. One week after clinching the Super Formula championship, Nojiri won the sixth round of the Super GT series at Autopolis alongside Fukuzumi, then won the following round at Motegi. They finished the year second in the drivers' championship.

In 2022, Nojiri and Fukuzumi won a shortened Golden Week race at Fuji Speedway.

Racing record

Career summary

† As Nojiri was a guest driver, he was ineligible to score points.‡ Team standings.* Season still in progress.

Complete Super GT results
(key) (Races in bold indicate pole position) (Races in italics indicate fastest lap)

‡ Half points awarded as less than 75% of race distance was completed.
* Season still in progress.

Complete Super Formula results
(key) (Races in bold indicate pole position) (Races in italics indicate fastest lap)

* Season still in progress.

References

External links

Official website
driverdb
Honda Racing profile

1989 births
Living people
Japanese racing drivers
Japanese Formula 3 Championship drivers
Super GT drivers
Super Formula drivers
Asian Le Mans Series drivers
Formula BMW Pacific drivers
Mugen Motorsports drivers
Dandelion Racing drivers
EuroInternational drivers
Karting World Championship drivers
Team Aguri drivers